Frankie Laine (1913–2007) was an American singer, songwriter, and actor.

Frankie Laine may also refer to:
Frankie Laine (1949 album)
Frankie Laine (1950 album)
Frankie Laine (wrestler), Canadian professional wrestler known as Cowboy Frankie Laine

See also
Frankie Lane (1948–2011), English footballer

Laine, Frankie